Barkuriha is a village in Nalbari district, Assam, India. As per 2011 Census of India, Barkuriha has a population of 2915 people with a literacy rate of 90.39%.

Barkuriha village had a history of militancy affected area.

References 

Villages in Nalbari district